

Places in the United States

 Delafield, Illinois, an unincorporated community
 Delafield, Wisconsin, a city
 Delafield (town), Wisconsin
 Delafield Township, Jackson County, Minnesota

People
 E. M. Delafield (1890–1943), British writer of the 1930s and 1940s
 Edward Delafield (1794–1875), American physician, father of Francis Delafield and brother to Richard Delafield
 Edward Coleman Delafield (1878–1976), American banker and soldier, president of the Bank of America
 Edward Henry Delafield (1880–1955), American politician and landowner
 Francis Delafield (1841–1915), American physician
 Joseph Delafield (1790–1875), American officer in the War of 1812, lawyer and diplomat
 Richard Delafield (1798–1873), Union Army major general during the American Civil War
 Rufus King Delafield (1802–1874), American banker and manufacturer
 Violetta White Delafield (1875–1949), American botanist, mycologist, scientific illustrator and horticulturist

See also
R. F. Delderfield (1912–1972), English novelist and dramatist